Galilaei is the name of two craters named after the astronomer Galileo Galilei:
 Galilaei (lunar crater), crater on the Moon
 Galilaei (Martian crater), crater on Mars